Your Future Our Clutter is an album by the Fall, released in the UK on 26 April 2010. It is the group's twenty-seventh studio album, and their first for independent record label Domino. The album was recorded at Chairworks Studios, Castleford and 6db Studio, Salford. Publicity for the record describes it as the group's "most rampant, most forward moving, bone shaking best." The album had previously been referred to as Our Future Your Clutter.

As with the group's preceding album, 2008's Imperial Wax Solvent, the line-up consists of Mark E. Smith (vocals), the group's chief songwriter and only constant member, as well as his wife Eleni Poulou (keyboards and vocals), Dave "The Eagle" Spurr (bass), Peter "PP" Greenway (guitar) and Keiron Melling (drums). The album was produced by Ross Orton, Mark E. Smith, and Simon "Ding" Archer, who produced three songs.

Your Future Our Clutter entered the UK Album charts at number No. 38. "Bury Pts. 1 + 3" peaked at No. 94 in France. The album has received favourable reviews, with New Yorker music critic Sasha Frere-Jones calling it one of the best albums of the year.

Track listing

CD edition

Vinyl edition
The double vinyl version comes on 180g heavyweight vinyl with two exclusive, non-CD tracks: "986 Generator" and "Get a Summer Song Goin'" and features a re-ordered track list. It does not come in a gatefold sleeve.

"Cowboy George" contains an uncredited sample of Daft Punk's "Harder, Better, Faster, Stronger", which is heard briefly fading in and out during the intro.

Personnel 
The Fall
 Mark E. Smith – lead vocals, tapes, production
 Eleni Poulou – keyboards, bass, backing vocals
 Peter "PP" Greenway – guitar
 Dave "The Eagle" Spurr – bass guitar
 Keiron Melling – drums, percussion
Technical
 Ross Orton – production, engineering, mixing  
 Simon "Ding" Archer – production, engineering 
 Tim Robbins – additional production, engineering
 Russell Fawcus – engineering 
 Chris Potter – mastering
 Mark Kennedy – cover art
 Safy Etiel – cover art

References

External links 
 "EXCLUSIVE INTERVIEW with The Fall's Elena Poulou" . La Bouche, issue 3. October 2009.
 Mojo excerpt
 Domino Recording Co. Twitter
 Your Future Our Clutter press release from Domino

2010 albums
The Fall (band) albums
Domino Recording Company albums
Albums recorded at Elevator Studios